John from the kindred Hahót (died 1294) was a Dominican friar of Hungarian noble-origin, who served as Bishop of Skradin from 1248 to 1266, then Archbishop of Split from 1266 to 1294. In this capacity, he styled himself "Primate of Dalmatia, Croatia and Slavonia" in his own documents.

References

Sources

 

1294 deaths
13th-century Hungarian people
John
Archbishops of Split
Hungarian Dominicans